Euphorbia chamaesyce, is an annual plant in the family Euphorbiaceae. It is native to North Africa, Europe and Asia.

References

chamaesyce
Plants described in 1753
Taxa named by Carl Linnaeus
Flora of Malta